The Church of the Holy Trinity is a historic church building of the Episcopal Church at South and Monroe Streets in Vicksburg, Mississippi.

It was designed by E.C. Jones and constructed in 1870 in a Romanesque style. The building was added to the National Register of Historic Places in 1978.

References

Episcopal church buildings in Mississippi
Churches on the National Register of Historic Places in Mississippi
Romanesque Revival church buildings in Mississippi
Churches completed in 1870
Buildings and structures in Vicksburg, Mississippi
19th-century Episcopal church buildings
National Register of Historic Places in Warren County, Mississippi